Up from the Beach is a 1965 French-American international co-production war film directed by Robert Parrish and starring Cliff Robertson, Red Buttons and James Robertson Justice.  It was based on a 1959 novel by George Barr called Epitaph for an Enemy.

Plot
Following the Normandy landings at Omaha Beach, an American squad frees a group of French hostages but takes several casualties in an assault in Vierville-sur-Mer.

They capture a German officer who has treated the French in his jurisdiction with kindness, but the American sergeant discovers that no one on the busy beachhead wishes to be bothered with prisoners.

Production
The film was filmed in Cherbourg with a French cast and was set in the aftermath of the Normandy Landings where a group of Allied soldiers attempt to shelter Frenchmen who faced execution by the Nazis.  As the US Department of Defense did not cooperate with the film, the American soldiers were played by French soldiers.

Robert Parrish recalled that Darryl F. Zanuck made the film to use unused footage from The Longest Day with the film then marketed as a sequel.  Cliff Robertson said he was given the Messerschmitt Bf 108 used in the film.  Robertson claimed Zanuck wanted to make the film to showcase his girlfriend Irina Demick who had appeared in The Longest Day.  Robertson called the film "Up From the Bitch" Irina Demick, Red Buttons and Fernand Ledoux appeared in the original
"The Longest Day".

Oskar Werner was the first choice for the German officer eventually played by Marius Goring.  Werner, a World War II Wehrmacht veteran refused on the ground that in his opinion no German officer of the time would have held such humane feelings as the officer portrayed in the film.

Reception
According to Fox records, the film needed to earn $4,200,000 in rentals to break even and made $2,645,000, meaning it made a loss.

References

External links

1965 films
French World War II films
20th Century Fox films
Operation Overlord films
Films directed by Robert Parrish
English-language French films
Films with screenplays by Stanley Mann
1960s English-language films
American World War II films
1960s American films
1960s French films